The Power of Wealth is a 1900 play by W. J. Lincoln. It was based on the novel Vendetta by Marie Corelli.

It was produced by Alfred Dampier in 1900 in a production featuring Alfred Rolfe and Lily Dampier.

References

External links
The Power of Wealth at AustLit

Australian plays
1900 plays
Adaptations of works by Marie Corelli